Bobsleigh at the 1972 Winter Olympics consisted of two events, at Sapporo Teine.  The competition took place between 4 and 12 February 1972.

Medal summary

Medal table

Three countries won medals in Sapporo, West Germany leading the medal table.

Events

Participating NOCs

Eleven nations participated in bobsleigh at the 1972 Games. Japan made their Olympic bobsleigh debut.

References

External links
Wallechinsky, David and Jaime Loucky (2009). "Bobsleigh". In The Complete Book of the Winter Olympics: 2010 Edition. London: Aurum Press Limited.

 
1972
1972 Winter Olympics events
1972 in bobsleigh